Kieran Setiya is a Professor of Philosophy at the Massachusetts Institute of Technology. He was born in Hull, UK.  He is known for his work in ethics, epistemology, and the philosophy of mind. Setiya is a co-editor of Philosophers' Imprint. He has also been active in public philosophy and hosts a podcast, Five Questions, in which he asks contemporary philosophers five questions about themselves.

Books
 Life is Hard, Riverhead Books (US), Hutchinson Heinemann (UK), 2022
 Midlife: A Philosophical Guide, Princeton University Press, 2017
 Practical Knowledge, Oxford University Press, 2016
 Knowing Right From Wrong, Oxford University Press, 2012
 Reasons without Rationalism, Princeton University Press, 2007

References

External links
[ http://www.ksetiya.net/ Personal website]

21st-century American philosophers
Philosophy academics
Living people
Moral psychologists
Year of birth missing (living people)
Massachusetts Institute of Technology faculty
Princeton University alumni
Alumni of Jesus College, Cambridge
Philosophers of mind
Epistemologists